Christopher Robert Wakeland (born June 15, 1975) is a former professional baseball player who played Major League Baseball, appearing in ten games for the Detroit Tigers in .

Wakeland was drafted by the Tigers out of Oregon State University in the 15th round (431st overall) of the 1996 Major League Baseball Draft.

Wakeland also played college baseball at George Fox University and was the first baseball player from that school to play in Major League Baseball.

Wakeland began his professional career with the Jamestown Jammers of the New York–Penn League in 1996. The Tigers added Wakeland to their 40-man roster in November 1999.

Before the 2000 season, Baseball America ranked Wakeland Detroit's ninth-best prospect.

He made his Major League debut on September 4, 2001 against the Chicago White Sox. He started in right field and was hitless in three plate appearances. On September 6, he picked up his first hit and run batted in on a fifth inning single against Matt Ginter which drove in Shane Halter. On September 18, he hit a home run against Brad Radke of the Minnesota Twins, the first home run of is career. He appeared in his tenth and final Major League game on October 6, 2001.

The Florida Marlins signed Wakeland to a minor league contract in November 2002.

Wakeland finished his professional baseball career with four seasons in independent baseball leagues from 2004 until 2007.

References

External links

Chris Wakeland at Baseball Almanac

1974 births
Living people
Detroit Tigers players
Baseball players from Oregon
Sportspeople from Huntington Beach, California
People from St. Helens, Oregon
Major League Baseball right fielders
Oregon State Beavers baseball players
Jamestown Jammers players
West Michigan Whitecaps players
Lakeland Tigers players
Gulf Coast Tigers players
Jacksonville Suns players
Toledo Mud Hens players
Buffalo Bisons (minor league) players
Albuquerque Isotopes players
Somerset Patriots players
Camden Riversharks players
Long Beach Armada players